The Savonoski River Archeological District encompasses a complex of prehistoric and historic archaeological sites on the Savonoski River near the mouth of the Grosvenor River in Katmai National Park and Preserve, located on the Alaska Peninsula of southwestern Alaska.  At least two sites, designated 49-MK-3 and 49-MK-4 by state archaeologists, were identified when the site was listed in 1978.  In 2003, the district was enlarge to include a third site, XMK-53.  This area is believed to be the site of one of a group of Native Alaskan settlements referred to in Russian records as "Severnovsk".  Excavations of a known prehistoric site in 1964 uncovered additional evidence of a post-contact settlement.

The district was listed on the National Register of Historic Places in 1978.

See also
Old Savonoski Site, a historic settlement destroyed by the 1912 eruption of Novarupta
National Register of Historic Places listings in Lake and Peninsula Borough, Alaska
National Register of Historic Places listings in Katmai National Park and Preserve

References

Archaeological sites on the National Register of Historic Places in Alaska
National Register of Historic Places in Katmai National Park and Preserve
National Register of Historic Places in Lake and Peninsula Borough, Alaska
Historic districts on the National Register of Historic Places in Alaska
1978 establishments in Alaska